Emergency Call is a 1933 American Pre-Code action film directed by Edward L. Cahn and written by Houston Branch and Joseph L. Mankiewicz. The film stars William Boyd, Wynne Gibson, William Gargan, George E. Stone and Betty Furness. The film was released on June 24, 1933 by RKO Pictures.

Cast
 William Boyd as Joe 
 Wynne Gibson as Mabel
 William Gargan as Steve
 George E. Stone as Sammie
 Betty Furness as Alice
 Edwin Maxwell as Rourke
 Merna Kennedy as Day File Clerk
 Oscar Apfel as Dr. Schwarz
 Paul Fix as Dr. Mason
 Helen Lynch as Telephone Operator 
 Jane Darwell as Head Nurse Brown (Uncredited)

References

External links
 
 
 
 

1933 films
American black-and-white films
1930s English-language films
RKO Pictures films
1930s action films
Films directed by Edward L. Cahn
Films scored by Roy Webb
American action films
1930s American films